"My Last Words" is a song by American thrash metal band Megadeth from their 1986 album Peace Sells... but Who's Buying?, written by Dave Mustaine.

Music and lyrics 
"My Last Words" is about a game of Russian roulette and the fear one goes through when playing the game. Despite being one of the lesser known tracks on the record, music journalist Martin Popoff said that the song was an example of the band's "fast thrashers" and an evidence why Megadeth were dubbed as the "fearless speed progenitors". The end section features shouted gang vocals.

Live performance 
"My Last Words" is rarely performed live by Megadeth nowadays. The song was a setlist staple through the eighties, having been played at many shows, including their first (where it appeared under the title "Next Victim"). After Nick Menza and Marty Friedman joined the band, however, it was mostly dropped from setlists. It has popped up sporadically for the past three decades.

In 2010, Metallica drummer Lars Ulrich requested that the band played the song at a concert at the Cow Palace on August 31, 2010. The song is reportedly his favorite Megadeth song.

In June and July 2018, Megadeth played the song at a few shows in dedication to Pantera drummer Vinnie Paul, who died on June 22, 2018. The performance at Hellfest was professionally shot and later uploaded to YouTube.
Mustaine announced the song by saying it was the first time the band played it in 20 years, although it had been played in 2005 and 2010.

Accolades

Personnel 
Production and performance credits are adapted from the album liner notes. 
Megadeth
Dave Mustaine – guitars, lead vocals
David Ellefson – bass, backing vocals
Chris Poland – guitars
Gar Samuelson – drums

Additional personnel
Casey McMackin - backing vocals

Production
Dave Mustaine – production
Randy Burns – production, engineering
Casey McMackin – engineering
Paul Lani – mixing
Stan Katayama – mixing

2004 remix and remaster
Dave Mustaine – production, mixing
Ralph Patlan – engineering, mixing
Lance Dean – engineering, editing
Scott "Sarge" Harrison – editing
Tom Baker – mastering

References 

1986 songs
Megadeth songs
Songs written by Dave Mustaine
Songs about death